The Farnham Group is a sub-range of the Purcell Mountains, containing the highest summit of that range, Mount Farnham.

Mountain ranges of British Columbia
Kootenays
Purcell Mountains